This is a list of marae (Māori meeting grounds) in the Tasman District of New Zealand.

List of marae

See also
 Lists of marae in New Zealand
 List of marae in Nelson, New Zealand
 List of schools in the Tasman District

References

Tasman District, List of marae in the
Marae
Marae in the Tasman District, List of